Bakary Fofana (born 20 October 1966) is a former boxer in the 1984 and 1988 Summer Olympics who represented the Cote d'Ivoire.

1988 Olympic results

Below is the record of Bakary Fofana, a featherweight boxer from the Ivory Coast who competed at the 1988 Seoul Olympics:

 Round of 64 lost to Wataru Yamada (Japan) referee stopped contest in first round

References

1966 births
Living people
Boxers at the 1984 Summer Olympics
Boxers at the 1988 Summer Olympics
Ivorian male boxers
Olympic boxers of Ivory Coast
Featherweight boxers